Lee Chang-seon (born 11 January 1956) is a South Korean judoka. He competed in the men's half-middleweight event at the 1976 Summer Olympics.

References

1956 births
Living people
South Korean male judoka
Olympic judoka of South Korea
Judoka at the 1976 Summer Olympics
Place of birth missing (living people)